Naharin, MdC transliteration nhrn, was the ancient Egyptian term for the kingdom of Mitanni during the 18th Dynasty of the New Kingdom of Egypt. The 18th dynasty was in conflict with the kingdom of Mitanni for control of the Levant from the reigns of Thutmose I, Thutmose III, and Amenhotep II. Amenhotep II's son, Thutmose IV, would eventually make peace with the Mitannians. Henceforth, relations between Egypt and Naharin (Mitanni) were peaceful with much diplomatic gift giving according to the correspondence of the Amarna Letters. The military annals of pharaoh Thutmose III refer to Naharin in explicit terms. In his 33rd Year, Thutmose III records:
 His Majesty travelled north capturing the towns and laying waste the settlements of that foe Naharin.

Literature
J. H. Breasted, Ancient Records of Egypt, Part Two, Chicago 1906

References

Mitanni
Ancient Egypt
Former kingdoms

de:Naharina